FC Darida Minsk Raion is a defunct Belarusian football club. Their home stadium was Darida Stadium, located in Kuntsevschina district in Minsk. They disbanded in 2008.

History 
The team originally represented Minsk suburb Zhdanovichi, where their office was located. After promotion to the Premier League they changed official location to Minsk Raion, though their office and stadium locations remained the same.

Darida started playing in the Second League in 2000. In the first season, the team finished first and won the promotion to the First League. In 2002, Darida won the First League and since 2003, they started playing in the Belarusian Premier League. Their best result came in 2006 when the team finished 8th. In 2008, Darida finished last, 16th place and was supposed to be relegated, but due to financial troubles was disbanded.

League and Cup history 

1 Including 6 games carried from the first round.

External links 
Darida at EUFO.DE
Darida at Weltfussballarchiv
Darida at Weltfussball.de
Darida at Football-Lineups.com
Profile at footballfacts

Defunct football clubs in Belarus
Football clubs in Minsk
2000 establishments in Belarus
2008 disestablishments in Belarus
Association football clubs established in 2000
Association football clubs disestablished in 2008